Austin Joseph Durney (November 26, 1867 – November 17, 1926) was a United States Navy sailor and a recipient of America's highest military decoration, the Medal of Honor.

Biography
Austin Durney was born on November 26, 1867, at Philadelphia, Pennsylvania. He enlisted in the U.S. Navy from the state of Maryland in 1890, and served during the Spanish–American War on board the gunboat . On May 11, 1898, Blacksmith Durney was one of several men who participated in a boat expedition that cut the underwater telegraph cable off Cienfuegos, Cuba. For his "extraordinary bravery and coolness" under enemy fire during this operation, he was awarded the Medal of Honor.   He was discharged from the Navy in 1900.

Austin J. Durney died on November 17, 1926, at Ridgely, Maryland, and was buried in Old Saint Joseph Cemetery, Cordova, Maryland.

Medal of Honor citation
Rank and organization: Blacksmith, U.S. Navy. Born: November 26, 1867, Philadelphia, Pa. Entered service at: Woodland, Mo. G.O. No.: 521, July 7, 1899.

Citation:

On board the U.S.S. Nashville during the operation of cutting the cable leading from Cienfuegos, Cuba, May 11, 1898. Facing the heavy fire of the enemy, Durney set an example of extraordinary bravery and coolness throughout this action.

See also

 List of Medal of Honor recipients for the Spanish–American War

References

 
 

1867 births
1926 deaths
United States Navy Medal of Honor recipients
American military personnel of the Spanish–American War
United States Navy sailors
Military personnel from Philadelphia
Spanish–American War recipients of the Medal of Honor